Wayne George Patterson was a fictional character on the long-running Australian police drama Blue Heelers, played by actor Grant Bowler. He starred in the show from its beginning until he was hit by a car and killed in episode 96 in 1996.

Wayne is a young member of the Mount Thomas team and is about Maggie's age. Maggie and Wayne attended the police academy together and dated for a while. After Maggie's mother died, Wayne and her lost touch and drifted apart until Maggie was posted in Mount Thomas to discover Wayne had actually been married to Roz Patterson and that he had been posted to Mount Thomas and was staying in the police residence.

Wayne goes through a lot while at Mount Thomas including the time he was shot and left for dead by the driver of a car he was about to help. He and Maggie were also taken hostage by dangerous criminals in the Mount Thomas hospital in the first season 3 episode ‘Once Only Withdrawal’. He was held at gunpoint numerous times, been accused of corruption and drug offences and was also known in Mount Thomas as a bit of a ‘ladies man’. He was part of the Traffic Operations Group at Mount Thomas and, later, became the District Firearms Officer.

Wayne's time as a Heeler was ended in the season 3 episode ‘An Act Of Random Violence’ when he was struck by a car and killed right outside of the Mount Thomas Police Station, while running across to save a child, who was in the path of the oncoming car. Wayne's position was initially filled by a senior detective (Frankie J. Holden) who was later found charged with falsifying evidence. He was then replaced by Constable Dash McKinley (Tasma Walton). Wayne's wife Roz briefly returns for Wayne's funeral, much to Nick's dislike who suspects she only returned to receive his life insurance and police benefits.

Blue Heelers characters
Fictional Australian police officers
Television characters introduced in 1994